QPac is the debut studio album by American rapper Quando Rondo. It was released on January 10, 2020, by Never Broke Again and Atlantic Records, following his 2019 mixtape From the Neighborhood to the Stage. The album's name makes reference to 2Pac. It features guest appearances from 2 Chainz, A Boogie wit da Hoodie, Lil Durk, Luh Kel and Polo G. The album also features production from several prestigious artists such as CashMoneyAP, JetsonMade, MP808, Tahj Money, and TnTXD.

QPac was supported by five singles: "Just Keep Going", "Double C's", "Marvelous" featuring Polo G, "Collect Calls", and "Bad Vibe" featuring A Boogie wit da Hoodie and 2 Chainz.  The album received generally positive reviews from music critics. It debuted at number two on the US Billboard 200 chart, earning 20,000 album-equivalent units in its first week.

Critical reception

QPac received generally positive reviews from critics. Fred Thomas from AllMusic stated that "Quando Rondo sharpened his talents for his official studio debut, QPac." He further noted that "Quando expands on the sung/rapped style he broke through with." Concluding his review, Tomas notes that QPac is "the rapper's most versatile collection up to this point, QPac displays more versatility and considered production choices than his great but sometimes monotonous mixtapes."

Track listing

Charts

References

2020 debut albums
Quando Rondo albums
Atlantic Records albums
Albums produced by JetsonMade